Emma Letitia Johnston  (born 1973) is the Dean of Science at the University of New South Wales and President of Science & Technology Australia. She is an authority in marine ecology and a former Pro Vice-Chancellor (Research) at UNSW. 

Johnston is head of the Applied Marine and Estuarine Ecology Lab at UNSW and has led major projects for industry, government, the Australian Research Council and the Australian Antarctic Science Program. 

Johnston was the inaugural Director of the Sydney Harbour Research Program at the Sydney Institute of Marine Science. 

Johnston's research group at UNSW investigates the ecology of human impacts in marine systems, combining the diverse disciplines of ecology, microbiology and ecotoxicology to expand fundamental understanding and provide recommendations for management.  Her research is conducted in such diverse field environments as Sydney Harbour, Antarctica, the Great Barrier Reef and temperate Australian estuaries. 

, Johnston has published over 112 peer-reviewed works.

Early life 
Born in 1973, to parents who were both scientists at that time, Johnston studied physics and chemistry in high school, not biology. However, being a keen sailor from a very young age and interested in all things to do with the water, she decided to focus on biology in her undergraduate degree (Bachelor of Science) at the University of Melbourne, which she completed in 1998 with first class Honours. 

Johnston completed her PhD in marine ecology in 2002 at the University of Melbourne under the supervision of Mick Keough.

She joined UNSW as an associate lecturer in 2001 and is now Dean of Science.

Career

Research
Among Johnston's significant research findings is the discovery that toxic contaminants facilitate the invasion of coastal waterways by non-indigenous species. Some of her research topics include: determining the major drivers of marine bio-invasions, the vulnerability of Antarctic marine communities, and developing new biomonitoring techniques and informing the development of effective management of biodiversity in Australian estuarine systems.

Other activities
Johnston is also a high profile science communicator, winning the 2015 Eureka Prize for Promoting Understanding of Australian Science Research. She is a regular media commentator and, as co-presenter of the Foxtel/BBC television series Coast Australia. has helped take Australian marine science to an international audience. She also launched a Sydney Harbour cruise called Underwater Secrets' – Sydney Harbour Revealed, which focuses on scientific research into the waterway. 

As President of Science & Technology Australia, Professor Johnston is also a public advocate for science and for increasing the participation of women in research.

Awards 
Johnston's research has led to her being a category winner in the 2012 NSW Science and Engineering Awards and in 2014 she won the inaugural Australian Academy of Science Nancy Millis Medal for Women in Science. This medal was presented to Johnston at Science at the Shine Dome on 28 May 2014. 

Johnston was a 2007 winner of the Australian Institute of Policy and Science's Tall Poppy Award for her research into the effects of introduced species and contaminants on existing Australian marine species. 

In 2015 Johnston won The Society for Environmental Toxicology and Chemistry AU Mid-Career Medal for excellence in scientific work in Australasia that has involved substantial environmental toxicology and chemistry. She is a Fellow of the Royal Society of New South Wales (FRSN).

Johnston was made an Officer of the Order of Australia (OA) in the 2018 Queen's Birthday Honours for "distinguished service to higher education, particularly to marine ecology and ecotoxicology, as an academic, researcher and administrator, and to scientific institutes." In September 2018 she was named one of The Australian Financial Review's 100 Women of Influence in the Innovation category. In December 2018 she was awarded the Clarke Medal by the Royal Society of New South Wales.

Johnston was elected Fellow of the Australian Academy of Technological Sciences and Engineering (FTSE) in 2019 and Fellow of the Australian Academy of Science in 2022.

References

External links
 Official profile at the University of New South Wales
 Emma Johnston on Coast Australia
 One Plus One 'Nature Plus Nurture' Summer Series: Emma Johnston Interview with Jane Hutcheon, ABC TV, broadcast 7 January 2016. Retrieved 29 April 2016.

Australian ecologists
Women ecologists
Australian women scientists
University of Melbourne alumni
Living people
1973 births
Australian toxicologists
Academic staff of the University of New South Wales
Officers of the Order of Australia
Fellows of the Australian Academy of Science
Fellows of the Royal Society of New South Wales
Fellows of the Australian Academy of Technological Sciences and Engineering